The Prehistoric Society is an international learned society devoted to the study of the human past from the earliest times until the emergence of written history.

Now based at University College London in the United Kingdom, it was founded by V. Gordon Childe, Stuart Piggott and Grahame Clark in 1935 but also traces its founding to the earlier Prehistoric Society of East Anglia which began in 1908. The society is a registered charity under English law.

Membership is by subscription and includes the annual journal, Proceedings of the Prehistoric Society, which continues Proceedings of the Prehistoric Society of East Anglia (1911-1934), and bulletins from the newsletter, PAST, which is published in April, July and November. It also organises regular conferences, lectures and other events and makes grants for archaeological research.

Awards 
The Prehistoric Society gives out a number of annual grants and awards, including the Baguley Award for the best contribution to that year's Proceedings. The Baguley Award is named in honour of Rodney M. Baguley and was inaugurated in 1979.

References

External links
 

Archaeological organizations
Archaeology of the United Kingdom
Learned societies of the United Kingdom
1935 establishments in England
Organizations established in 1935
Charities based in England